Landjuweel (lit. "jewel of the land") is the highest award for an amateur theatrical troupe to have received in Belgium. It has its historical origin in the contests among the Chamber of rhetoric of different cities of the Low Countries.

History

13th-14th century 
The Landjuweel started out as a cycle of seven shooting matches between the Schutterij guilds in Brabant, who used the opportunity to practice the handling of arms. The upper classes of the country would witness the shootings. Occasionally sovereigns like William the Silent and Charles V also took part in the matches.

A landjuweel match was held for every three years. The winner of each landjuweel had to set up the next landjuweel. The winner of the seventh landjuweel had to start a new cycle.

The winner of the first landjuweel received one silver bowl, and they would have to make two silver bowls for the match next year. The winner of the second landjuweel had to have three silver bowls made for the next game, and so on until the seventh match.

15th-16th century 
In the 15th century, literary societies called "chambers of rhetoric" emerged in the Low Countries, and some of them would retain their original constitution, at least in part, until the end of the 18th century. Their members were from the middle and upper classes. The rhetoricians cultivated the art of poetry by competing against each other at the forefront of great festivities either private or public. Soon, these activities gave rise to urban festivities, celebrated successively in all the major cities. The literary contests within the festivals were transformed into local or regional rituals that lasted for days and even up to three weeks, and often with endorsement from the municipal authorities. The chambers would held these competitions in taverns, theater or public assemblies. 

The oldest recorded festivals was the one opened in Brussels in 1394. Many of the later festivals were also documented, including one in Oudenaarde in 1413; Veurne in 1419; Dunkirk in 1426; Bruges in 1427 and in 1441; Mechelen in 1427, and L'Écluse in 1431. The name landjuweel and the system of the additional silver bowls were adopted by the Brabant Chambers of rhetoric. In each festival, winner would be selected from works in either French or Dutch, depending on the common language of the host city. But some festivals would consider works in both languages in the competition. This was particularly the case in Ghent in 1439.

Participants 
Chambers from both northern and southern part of the Low Countries participated in the festivals. For instance, the landjuweel of Antwerp in 1496 featured participants from Reimerswaal, a town in the county of Zeeland; and from Amsterdam, a town in the county of Holland. Under feudal system, competitions for rhetoricians from Flemish municipalities even continued to take place under the French rule. For instance, a chamber based in Bailleul named Jong van Zinnen (Les Jeunes Cœurs) organized one landjuweel in 1769, attracting thirteen societies to participate in presenting the Tragedy of Mithridates. The thirteen chamers were from the following towns: Steenvoorde, Ypres, Alveringem, Polincove, Lo, Flêtre, Bergues, Roeselare, Hondschoote, Diksmuide, Nouvelle-Église, Strazeele and Poperinge.

Themes 
Questions were proposed which only the authorized chambers could answer in verse. These questions were resolved by the facteurs, and usually had a moral or political purpose. The competitions were sometimes open for poems; at other times, prizes were awarded for songs. However, major competitions would often ask for a whole drama as response.

Organization 
The name of the prize would change based on the host location. For competitions organized in cities, the prize would be referred to as landjuweel (lit. "the jewel of the land"), whereas competitions organized in towns or communes would have their prize called haagjuweel (lit. "the jewel of the hedge").

The landjuweel later evolved into a series of theatrical competitions organized by the chambers of rhetoric. The rhetorical guilds of the Low Countries were invited to take part. The chambers would compete against each other in skill, processions, tableau vivant, charades, drama competitions and poetry competitions. The chamber that won the previous landjuweel would be the superintendent of the festival. The works were divided into two categories: esbattement (farce) and spel van sinne (morality play), and a jury made up of representatives from the chambers themselves determined the best work in each category.

Cycles 

Two landjuweel cycles are known from the rhetoricians. The first ran from about 1475 to 1510, and included documented landjuweels held in the following cities:

 Leuven in 1478 and 1480;
 Mechelen in 1492, in which the then duke Philip the fair attempted to submit the chambers for ecclesiastical censorship;
 Antwerp in 1496, in which the Amsterdam chamber of Egelantier participated and won the prize of two silver bowls;
 Lier in 1500;
 Leuven in 1505;
 Reimerswaal in 1507, the first landjuweel to be held in the north, and only seven of the Zeeland chambers of rhetoric participated.
 Herentals in 1510, in which only chambers from Brabant participated.

For the second cycle, the cities that hosted each landjuweels are listed below:

 Mechelen in 1515;
 Leuven in 1518;
 Diest in 1521 and 1541;
 Brussels in 1532;
 Mechelen in 1535;
 Antwerp in 1561.

The morality plays about the last landjuweel cycle were printed in 1562. Only Brabant chambers participated in the second cycle, including chambers of the following places: Antwerp, Brussels, Mechelen, Leuven, 's-Hertogenbosch, Breda, Bergen op Zoom, Diest, Lier, Leau, Vilvoorde and Herentals. The continuity was interrupted by the wars between the Habsburg Netherlands and France, in addition to the growing suspicion of the authorities towards the chambers of rhetoric.

Counter-Reformation 
After the Fall of Antwerp in 1585 and the Counter-Reformation that followed, landjuweel and other literary activities were being limited by the government. The chambers of rhetoric and other literally societies that took refuge during the 16th century, being outspoken writers of the Low Countries, were now considered dangerous by the authorities, from the perspective on both faith and morals. A poster, promulgated in 1593 under the governor Peter Ernst I von Mansfeld-Vorderort, ordered the rhetorical activities to be suspended "since their representations offend the chaste ears". In 1601, another edict placed all plays under censorship in order to prevent sacred things from being treated lightly. Rhetorical activities and competitions were only allowed to be organized following the signing of Twelve Years' Truce. The De Peoene chamber of Mechelen organized a competition of heraldry in 1620, for which its facteur, Hendrik Faydherbe, wrote an esbattement. The license of the chambers were still condemned twice separately, by Isabella Clara Eugenia in 1631 and Bishop of Ghent Antoine Triest in 1650.

20th-21st century 

The landjuweel was reinstated in 1922 by King Albert I, with the help of Herman Teirlinck, as the most prestigious award for a Flemish amateur theater company. It concerns a single silver bowl that is in principle awarded annually as a challenge cup during the Landjuweel Tournament at the end of October.

In the early 1950s, King Baudouin donated a jewel bowl that symbolizes landjuweel for the current tournament. In practice, a cash prize is offered to the winning group whole the bowl was kept in the Sterckshof  Silver Museum in Deurne. The bowl can be seen on the Suikerrui in Antwerp.

The landjuweel was awarded for the last time in 2012. Subsequently, a new concept was developed in which qualitative productions were selected during a preliminary round and were allowed to participate in the Landjuweel Festival. Since 2016, the Landjuweel Festival takes place in a different city each year.

The jewel 
The current Landjuweel is a silver bowl with a diameter of 70 cm (2 ft 4 in) and a weight of 8 kg (17.6 lb). Inscribed were the Coat of arms of Belgium, the Flemish provinces and the blazons of the following chambers of rhetoric:

 Bruges: "De Heilige Geest" (The Holy Ghost)
 Ghent: "De Fonteine van de Heilige Drievuldigheid" (The Fountain of the Holy Trinity)
 Antwerp: "De Violier" (The Gillyflower)
 Limburg: "De Oliftak" (The Olve Branch) of Sint-Truiden, "De Goudbloem" (The Gold Flower) of Borgloon, "De Witte Lelie" (The White Lily) of Tongeren, "De Rode Roos" (The Red Rose) of Hasselt, "De Korenblowm" (The Cornflower) of Bilzen
 Brussels: "Het Mariakranske" (The Mariakranske)

Galleries

References 

Theatre festivals
Theatre awards
Theatre in Flanders